Man on Ground is a 2011 Nigerian South African drama film directed by Akin Omotoso. It was screened and premiered at the 2011 Toronto International Film Festival. The film tells a story about how Xenophobia in South Africa affect the lives of two Nigerian brothers.

Plot
Ade, an accomplished financial executive and his brother Femi are South-African immigrants. Unknown to Ade, his brother, who is in South-Africa because of a self-imposed exile due to political affiliation in Nigeria has been kidnapped. On discovery that his brother is missing Ade carries out investigations to unravel the mystery and discovers the difficult lifestyle subjected to him. Ade pays homage to a former employer of Femi, when violence occurred which forced him to live with the boss. The frequent violent riot in the neighbourhood opens up many revelation on the life of his brother.

Cast
Hakeem Kae-Kazim as Ade
Fabian Adeoye Lojede as Femi
Fana Mokoena as Timothy
Bubu Mazibuko as Lindiwe
Thishiwe Ziqubu as Zodwa
Makhaola Ndebele as Vusi
Mandisa Bardill as Nadia
Joshua Chisholm as Young Ade
Mbongeni Nhlapo as Young Femi
Eugene Khoza as Hype man

Release
It had its premiere at the 2011 Toronto International Film Festival on 12 September 2011.

Accolades

References

External links

Nigerian drama films
South African drama films
English-language Nigerian films
English-language South African films
Yoruba-language films
Zulu-language films
2010s English-language films
Films directed by Akin Omotoso